Arlington is a city in northern Snohomish County, Washington, United States, part of the Seattle metropolitan area. The city lies on the Stillaguamish River in the western foothills of the Cascade Range, adjacent to the city of Marysville. As of the 2020 U.S. census, Arlington had a population of 19,868; its estimated population is 20,075 as of 2021.

Arlington was established in the 1880s by settlers and the area was platted as two towns, Arlington and Haller City. Haller City was absorbed by the larger Arlington, which was incorporated as a city in 1903. During the Great Depression of the 1930s, the Arlington area was the site of major projects undertaken for employment under the direction of federal relief agencies, including construction of a municipal airport that would serve as a naval air station during World War II. Arlington began suburbanizing in the 1980s, growing by more than 450 percent by 2000 and annexing the unincorporated area of Smokey Point to the southwest.

The economy of the Arlington area historically relied on timber and agriculture. In the early 21st century, it has transitioned to a service economy, with some aviation industry jobs near the municipal airport. The city is governed by a mayor–council government, electing a mayor and seven city councilmembers. The municipal government maintains the city's parks system and water and wastewater utilities. Other services, including public utilities, public transportation, and schools, are contracted to regional or county-level agencies and companies.

History

Pre-contact and settlement

Prior to American settlement in the 19th century, the Puget Sound region was inhabited by indigenous Coast Salish peoples. The Stillaguamish people had a permanent village at the confluence of the two forks of the Stillaguamish River where they followed fish runs. This village, called Skabalco or Skabalko meaning "confluence"), had two winter houses, with 200-300 people living there at the time. The early settlement of Haller City (now Haller Park) was later developed just downriver of this site. The area slightly south of the river is called , meaning "wolf"; Arlington was later developed there. The modern-day neighborhood of Kent Prairie was once a prairie where members of the tribe would gather wild crops. They also had a major village at  upriver near modern-day Trafton 

American exploration of the area began in 1851, when prospector Samuel Hancock was led by Indian guides on a canoe up the Stillaguamish River. The area was opened to logging after the signing of the Treaty of Point Elliott in 1855 between the United States government and the Stillaguamish tribe, who were relocated to trust lands and the Tulalip Indian Reservation.

The U.S. Army built a military road connecting Fort Steilacoom to Fort Bellingham, crossing the Stillaguamish River near the confluence. In the 1880s, wagon roads were constructed to this area from the towns of Marysville to the south and Silvana to the west, bringing entrepreneurs to the logging camps, informally named "The Forks". The area's first store was opened in 1888 by Nels K. Tvete and Nils C. Johnson, and was followed by a hotel with lodging and meals for loggers.

Two settlements were established on the south side of the confluence in anticipation of the Seattle, Lake Shore and Eastern Railway building a track through the area. G. Morris Haller, son of Colonel Granville O. Haller, founded a settlement on the banks of the Stillaguamish River in 1883, naming it "Haller City".

The Seattle, Lake Shore & Eastern Railroad chose to build its depot on higher ground to the south of Haller City, leading contractors Earl & McLeod to establish a new town at the depot on March 15, 1890. The new town was named "Arlington" after Lord Henry Arlington, member of the cabinet of King Charles II of England. Arlington and Haller City were platted within a month of each other in 1890, quickly developing a rivalry that would continue for several years.

Arlington and Haller City grew rapidly in their first years, reaching a combined population of 500 by 1893, relying on agriculture, dairy farming and the manufacturing of wood shingles as their main sources of income. Both towns established their own schools, post offices, saloons, general stores, churches, social clubs, and hotels. The two towns were separated by a  tract claimed by two settlers in 1891, preventing either town from fully absorbing the other. During the late 1890s, the claim dispute was settled and merchants began moving to the larger, more prosperous Arlington, signalling the end for Haller City. Today, Haller City is memorialized in the name of a park in downtown Arlington, as well as a middle school operated by the Arlington School District.

Incorporation and early 20th century

Arlington was incorporated as a fourth-class city on May 20, 1903, including the remnants of Haller City (located north of modern-day Division Street). The incorporation came after a referendum on May 5, in which 134 of 173 voters approved the city's incorporation. The new city elected shingle mill owner John M. Smith as its first mayor. In the years following incorporation, Arlington gained a local bank, a cooperative creamery, a city park, a library, electricity, and telephone service.

During the early 20th century, Arlington's largest employers remained its shingle mills and saw mills. Other industries, including dairy processing, mechanical shops, stores, and factories, became prominent after World War I, during a period of growth for the city. The Great Depression of the 1930s forced all but one of the mills to close, causing unemployment to rise in Arlington and neighboring cities. The federal government established a Civilian Conservation Corps (CCC) camp near Darrington to create temporary jobs; the young men built structures and conducted firefighting in the Mount Baker National Forest. The Works Progress Administration and Civil Works Administration funded the construction of the city's sidewalks, a high school, and a municipal airport that opened in 1934.

The entry of the United States into World War II brought the U.S. Navy to Arlington, resulting in the conversion of the municipal airport into a naval air station in 1943. The Navy constructed new runways and hangars and, beginning in 1946, the municipal government was allowed to operate civilian and commercial services. Ownership of the airport was formally transferred from the federal government back to the city of Arlington in 1959.

On October 19, 1959, a Boeing 707-227 crashed on the banks of the Stillaguamish River's North Fork during a test flight, killing four of eight occupants. The plane, being flown by Boeing test pilots instructing personnel from Braniff International Airways, lost three engines and suffered a fire in the fourth after a dutch roll had been executed beyond maximum bank restrictions. The plane made an emergency landing in the riverbed while unsuccessfully trying to reach a nearby open field.

Suburbanization and present day

The completion of Interstate 5 and State Route 9 in the late 1960s brought increased residential development in Arlington, forming a bedroom community for commuters who worked in Everett and Seattle. Despite the influx of commuting residents, Arlington retained its small-town image while unsuccessfully attempting to lure new industries and a state college. Suburban housing developments began construction in the 1980s and 1990s, driving a 450 percent increase in Arlington's population to 15,000 by 2007. In 1999, Arlington annexed the community of Smokey Point, located along Interstate 5 to the southwest of the city, after a lengthy court battle with Marysville, which instead was permitted to annex Lakewood to the west. The city began developing a large business park around the municipal airport in the 1990s, bringing the city's number of jobs to a total of 11,000 by 2003.

The city of Arlington celebrated its centennial in 2003 with a parade, a festival honoring the city's history, sporting events, and musical and theatrical performances. The centennial celebrations culminated in the dedication of the $44 million Arlington High School campus, attended by an all-class reunion of the old school. In 2007, the city of Arlington renovated six blocks of downtown's Olympic Avenue at a cost of $4.4 million, widening sidewalks, improving street foliage, and adding new street lights. The project was credited with helping revitalize the city's downtown, turning Olympic Avenue into a gathering place for residents and a venue for festivals.

A total of 43 people were killed and nearly 50 structures destroyed. The landslide closed State Route 530 to Darrington, cutting the town off, leaving Arlington as the center of the coordinated emergency response to the disaster. Arlington was recognized for its role in aiding victims of the disaster and hosted U.S. President Barack Obama during his visit to the site in April.

The city has continued to grow in the late 2010s, with new apartment buildings constructed in Smokey Point, including those designed as retirement communities.

Geography

The city is in the northwestern part of Snohomish County in Western Washington, and is considered part of the Seattle metropolitan area. Arlington's city limits are generally defined to the south by Marysville at State Route 531 (172nd Street NE) and roughly 165th Street NE, to the west by Interstate 5, to the north by the Stillaguamish River valley, and to the east by the Cascade Range foothills. The city's urban growth boundary includes  within and outside of city limits.

The city lies on a glacial terrace formed during the Pleistocene epoch by the recession of the Cordilleran Ice Sheet. Downtown Arlington is situated on a bluff above the confluence of the Stillaguamish River and its North and South Forks. Most of Arlington sits in the watersheds of the Stillaguamish River, Portage Creek, and Quilceda Creek. From various points in Arlington, the Olympic Mountains,
Mount Pilchuck, and Mount Rainier are visible on the horizon.

Subareas and neighborhoods

The city of Arlington publishes a decennial comprehensive plan, which divides the urban growth area into ten planning subareas, each containing neighborhoods and subdivisions.
 Old Town consists of downtown Arlington and surrounding residential neighborhoods built during the early 20th century. The northern reaches of Old Town include commercial areas developed during the post-war period that are distinct from older buildings along Olympic Avenue.
 Arlington Bluff is a residential area between the Stillaguamish River floodplain and the Arlington Municipal Airport industrial center.
 Kent Prairie, a residential area south of Old Town, was developed in the early post-war period. The subarea also includes retail stores centered around the intersection of State Route 9 and 204th Street NE. The area was once home to a Stillaguamish village, as well as Arlington's first schoolhouse, built in 1884.
 The designated Manufacturing Industrial Center is an industrial district southwest of Old Town, surrounding the Arlington Municipal Airport and the city's only active railroad.
 Hilltop consists of Arlington's largest planned residential subdivisions, including Gleneagle, Crown Ridge, and the Magnolias. It is south of Kent Prairie on a large terrace on the west side of State Route 9. Gleneagle is Arlington's largest single development, with over 1,000 homes and a private golf course.
 The Brekhus/Beach subarea, also known as Burn Hill, is a residential area southeast of Old Town and is centered along Burn Road.

The West Arlington Subarea, designated in 2011, combines several neighborhoods annexed by Arlington in the 1990s and 2000s, including Smokey Point and Island Crossing.
 Smokey Point, annexed by Arlington in 1999, is a major commercial and residential area at the junction of Interstate 5 and State Route 531, southwest of Arlington. Portions of Smokey Point extend south and west into the city of Marysville, which annexed the area in the 2000s.
 Island Crossing, at the junction of Interstate 5 and State Route 530, is a rural community with a cluster of retail stores. It was annexed by Arlington in 2008, and has been re-designated for commercial development.
 The proposed King-Thompson subarea is northwest of Smokey Point and lies outside of Arlington's city limits and urban growth boundary. It has been identified as a potential area for extensive residential development. The municipal government applied to annex the area into the city's urban growth area in 2013, but withdrew the application in 2016.

Climate

Arlington has a general climate similar to most of the Puget Sound lowlands, with dry summers and mild, rainy winters moderated by a marine influence from the Pacific Ocean. The majority of the region's precipitation arrives during the winter and early spring, and Arlington averages 181 days of precipitation per year.

The highest recorded temperature, occurred on June 28, 2021, amid a regional heat wave, and the lowest, occurred on January 1, 1979. According to the Köppen climate classification system, Arlington has a warm-summer Mediterranean climate (Csb).

Demographics

The city of Arlington had a population of 19,868 people at the time of the 2020 U.S. census, making it the tenth largest of eighteen cities in Snohomish County. From 1980 to 2010, Arlington's population increased by over 450 percent, fueled by the construction of suburban housing and annexations of outlying areas. The United States Census Bureau estimates the city's 2021 population at 20,075. In 2005, the Arlington city council projected that the city's population would double from 15,000 to 30,528 by 2025; updated estimates in 2017 projected a population of 25,000 by 2035.

2010 census

As of the 2010 census, there were 17,926 people, 6,563 households, and 4,520 families residing in the city. The racial makeup of the city was 85.6% White, 1.2% African American, 1.4% Native American, 3.3% Asian, 0.3% Pacific Islander, 3.9% from other races, and 4.2% from two or more races. Hispanic or Latino of any race were 9.5% of the population.

There were 6,563 households, of which 40.3% had children under the age of 18 living with them, 50.7% were married couples living together, 12.6% had a female householder with no husband present, 5.6% had a male householder with no wife present, and 31.1% were non-families. 24.0% of all households were made up of individuals, and 10.2% had someone living alone who was 65 years of age or older. The average household size was 2.70 and the average family size was 3.21.

The median age in the city was 34.3 years. 28.3% of residents were under the age of 18; 8.7% were between the ages of 18 and 24; 29.2% were from 25 to 44; 22.4% were from 45 to 64; and 11.3% were 65 years of age or older. The gender makeup of the city was 48.6% male and 51.4% female.

2000 census

As of the 2000 census, there were 11,713 people, 4,281 households, and 3,097 families residing in the city. The population density was 1,548.4 people per square mile (598.2/km). There were 4,516 housing units at an average density of 597.0 per square mile (230.6/km). The racial makeup of the city was 90.0% White, 1.1% African American, 1.0% Native American, 2.2% Asian, 0.3% Pacific Islander, 2.5% from other races, and 2.8% from two or more races. Hispanic or Latino of any race were 5.8% of the population.

There were 4,281 households, out of which 42.6% had children under the age of 18 living with them, 56.7% were married couples living together, 11.5% had a female householder with no husband present, and 27.7% were non-families. 22.7% of all households were made up of individuals, and 9.3% had someone living alone who was 65 years of age or older. The average household size was 2.72 and the average family size was 3.19.

In the city, the age distribution of the population shows 31.5% under the age of 18, 8.0% from 18 to 24, 32.6% from 25 to 44, 18.4% from 45 to 64, and 9.6% who were 65 years of age or older. The median age was 32 years. For every 100 females, there were 93.3 males. For every 100 females age 18 and over, there were 91.2 males.

The median income for a household in the city was $40,000, and the median income for a family was $51,941. Males had a median income of $41,517 versus $26,912 for females. The per capita income for the city was $19,146. About 5.8% of families and 7.2% of the population were below the poverty line, including 9.2% of those under the age of 18 and 10.4% of those age 65 and older.

Economy

, Arlington has an estimated 9,481 residents who were in the workforce, either employed or unemployed. The average one-way commute for Arlington workers in 2015 was approximately 30 minutes; 85 percent of workers drove alone to their workplace, while 7 percent carpooled, and 2 percent used public transit. , only 12 percent of employed Arlington residents work within city limits, while approximately 17 percent commute to Everett, 9 percent to Seattle, 8 percent to Marysville, 3 percent to Bellevue, 2 percent to Renton, and 49 percent to other cities, each of which accounted for less than 2 percent. The largest industry of employment for Arlington workers are educational services and health care, with approximately 19 percent, followed by manufacturing (18%), retail (11%), and food services (10%).

Arlington's early economy relied heavily on timber harvesting and processing, notably the production of red cedar wood shingles at mills that closed during the Great Depression of the 1930s. Locally, Arlington was known as the "Shingle Capital of the World", although mills in Everett and Ballard produced more shingles at the time. Agriculture and dairy farming emerged as significant industries to Arlington during the early 20th century, with farms lining the floodplain of the Stillaguamish River. A major cooperative creamery and condensery was established in Arlington during the 1910s, but later moved to Mount Vernon after World War II.

The transformation of Arlington into a bedroom community for Everett and Seattle during the 1980s and 1990s came with it a move towards a service economy. Among the largest employers of Arlington residents are the Boeing Everett Factory and Naval Station Everett. The expansion of the aerospace industry in the Seattle region led Arlington to develop its own municipal airport into an aerospace job center, which includes a high concentration of Boeing subcontractors. , the airport has 130 on-site businesses that employ 590 people, with an annual economic output of $94.5 million. Aircraft manufacturer Glasair Aviation is based in Arlington, and Eviation Aircraft uses its Arlington hangars for assembly and testing of the Eviation Alice, an electric prototype model.

The city of Arlington plans to increase the number of jobs within the city to over 20,000 by 2035, bolstered by the designation of the Cascade Industrial Center by the Puget Sound Regional Council in 2019. The industrial center, located between the two cities near Smokey Point, already included major distribution centers and other light industry in the 2000s. A five-story Amazon distribution center is planned to be constructed near the airport in 2021 at a cost of $355 million.

Government and politics

Arlington is defined as a non-charter code city and operates under a mayor–council government, with an elected mayor and an elected city council. The mayor serves a four-year term and has no term limits. Barbara Tolbert was elected mayor in 2011 and re-elected in 2015 and 2019. Tolbert's predecessors included John and Margaret Larson, who served as mayor from 1980 to 1990 and 2003 to 2011, respectively.

The city council is composed of seven residents who are elected in at-large, non-partisan elections to four-year terms. The council also appoints a city administrator to oversee city operations. The council meets twice per month on Mondays in a chamber at city hall in downtown Arlington. According to the Washington State Auditor, Arlington's municipal government employs 128 people full-time and operates on an annual budget of $50 million. The city government switched to a biennial budget in 2017, after an ordinance was passed by the city council in 2016. The municipal government provides emergency services, as well as water and sewage utilities, street maintenance, parks and recreation, an airport, and a cemetery. Arlington's municipal fire department was annexed into the North County Regional Fire Authority in 2021, joining Stanwood and several unincorporated areas.

At the federal level, Arlington is part of Washington's 2nd congressional district, which has been represented by Democrat Rick Larsen since 2001. At the state level, the city is part of the 39th legislative district along with eastern Marysville, Monroe, and Sedro-Woolley. Arlington is wholly part of the Snohomish County Council's 1st district, which covers the northeastern areas of the county.

During the 2016 U.S. presidential election, 50.6 percent of Arlington voters chose Republican Donald Trump, while 39.5 percent voted for Democrat Hillary Clinton. During the same year's gubernatorial election, 42.9 percent of Arlington voters preferred incumbent Democrat Jay Inslee, while 56.8 percent voted for Republican Bill Bryant. During the 2012 presidential election, Democrat Barack Obama won Arlington narrowly with 50.6 percent of votes. Arlington was proposed as the county seat of the secessionist Freedom County in the 1990s and 2000s, but the proposal was struck down by state courts.

Culture

Arts

Public art has been mandated for public construction projects in Arlington since a 2007 ordinance setting 1 percent of the budget for new artworks. The Arlington Arts Council, a volunteer organization established in 2004, has acquired 30 sculptures and murals that form the city's Sculpture Walk in downtown Arlington and along the Centennial Trail. The Arlington High School campus has a performing arts venue, the Byrnes Performing Arts Center, which opened in 2007. A fine arts and crafts festival has been held annually at Legion Park since 2008 and is organized by the Arlington Arts Council. The city is also located near the Pilchuck Glass School, a rural art school that focuses on glass art.

Parks and recreation

Park facilities include nature preserves, neighborhood parks, sports fields, playgrounds, boat launches, and gardens. The Arlington School District also has  of sports fields and playgrounds that are open to public use during non-school hours.

Arlington's largest park is the County Charm Park and Conservation Area, located east of downtown Arlington along the South Fork Stillaguamish River. The  park was purchased from the Graafstra family in 2010, and is planned to be developed into sports fields, hiking trails, camping areas, and a swimming beach, in addition to a  riparian habitat. Across the South Fork is Twin Rivers Park, Arlington's second-largest park, a  park with sports fields that is owned by Snohomish County but maintained by the city of Arlington. The city's third-largest park, Bill Quake Memorial Park, consists of soccer and baseball fields on  near Arlington Municipal Airport.

The county government also owns the Portage Creek Wildlife Area, a  wildlife reserve located outside of city limits near downtown Arlington. The reserve was originally a dairy farm that was restored into wetland habitat in the 1990s and 2000s.

Both trails use right of way acquired by Snohomish County after they were abandoned by the Burlington Northern Railroad in the late 20th century. The city of Arlington also maintains a  unpaved walking trail around the Arlington Municipal Airport.

Festivals and events

The Arlington Municipal Airport hosts the annual "Arlington Fly-In" air show during the summer, traditionally the weekend after Independence Day but later changed to August. The Fly-In has operated annually since 1969 and is the third-largest event of its kind in the United States, with over 50,000 visitors and 1,600 planes participating.

The Downtown Arlington Business Association hosts several annual events in downtown Arlington, including a car show in June, a street fair on Olympic Avenue in July, and a Viking festival in October. Legion Park hosts a weekend farmers' market from June to September and is also used as a staging ground for holiday parades. The Stillaguamish Tribe hosts an annual powwow and festival of the river at River Meadows County Park on the South Fork of the Stillaguamish River in August.

Media

Arlington has one weekly newspaper, The Arlington Times, which has been published in the Arlington area since 1890. It has been under common ownership with the Marysville Globe since 1964; Sound Publishing, which acquired both papers in 2007, suspended their publication in March 2020 in the wake of the COVID-19 pandemic. The Herald in Everett serves the entire county, including Arlington, and prints daily editions. Arlington is also part of the Seattle–Tacoma media market, and is served by Seattle-based media outlets including The Seattle Times; broadcast television stations KOMO-TV, KING-TV, KIRO-TV, and KCPQ-TV; and various radio stations.

Arlington has been part of the Sno-Isle Libraries system, which operates public libraries in Island and Snohomish counties, since its inception in 1962. A  library near downtown Arlington opened on June 28, 1981, and holds over 54,000 items. It was originally owned by the city government and was transferred to Sno-Isle in 2021 as part of preparations for a renovation, which had been planned since the 2000s. Sno-Isle identified the Arlington Library as a top priority for renovation and expansion in 2016, while also emphasizing the need for a new library to serve Smokey Point. A pilot library for Smokey Point opened in January 2018, using a leased retail space. Arlington had a single-screen, 381-seat movie theater, the Olympic Theatre in downtown Arlington, that operated from 1939 to 2014.

Historical preservation

The volunteer-operated Stillaguamish Valley Pioneer Museum, southwest of downtown Arlington, opened in 1997. The museum overlooks the Stillaguamish River and features preserved household items, logging equipment, and vehicles, historic newspapers and images from the Arlington area, and a model railroad.

The Arlington area has two properties listed on the National Register of Historic Places (NRHP). The Trafton School in Trafton was built in 1888 and re-built in 1912 after a fire. It was listed as a historic place in 2006, shortly before it was closed by the Arlington School District. The Arlington Naval Auxiliary Air Station (part of the modern-day Arlington Municipal Airport) was listed as a historic place in 1995.

Notable people

 Kenneth Boulton, pianist
 Bob Drewel, former County Executive
 McKenna Geer, Paralympian in shooting
 Celia M. Hunter, environmentalist and conservationist
 John Koster, former state legislator and County Councilmember
 Rick Larsen, U.S. Congressman
 Erik Norgard, American football player

Education

Public schools in Arlington are operated by the Arlington School District, which covers most of the incorporated city and also includes the outlying areas of Arlington Heights, Bryant, Getchell, and Sisco Heights. The district had an enrollment of approximately 5,528 students in 2014 and has nine total schools, including one high school, two middle schools, four elementary schools, and two alternative learning facilities. In the early 2000s, the school district opened four new schools to replace other facilities as part of a $54 million bond measure passed by Arlington voters in 2000. The Smokey Point neighborhood is served by the Lakewood School District, which is in unincorporated North Lakewood and served the area prior to its annexation by Arlington.

The college has offered basic skills and job training courses at Arlington's Weston High School since 2016, including a branch of its Advanced Manufacturing Training & Education Center.

In 1966, the Smokey Point area was proposed as the location of a four-year public college, with  offered by the city of Arlington to the state government. The Washington State Legislature decided to build the college instead in Olympia, becoming The Evergreen State College. The Smokey Point area was again offered by Arlington and Marysville as the site of a University of Washington branch campus in the 2000s, but the project was put on hold and later declined by the state legislature in favor of a Washington State University branch campus in Everett.

Infrastructure

Transportation

Downtown Arlington is located near the junction of State Route 9 and State Route 530, which serve as the main highways to the city. From Arlington, State Route 9 travels north into Skagit County and south to Snohomish; and State Route 530 travels west to an interchange with Interstate 5, the main north–south highway between Seattle and Vancouver, British Columbia, and east to Darrington. Within the city is an additional state highway, State Route 531, which connects Smokey Point, the municipal airport, and Gleneagle to Interstate 5 and State Route 9 in the southern part of the city. Other major arterial roads include Smokey Point Boulevard and 67th Avenue NE, which serve as north–south thoroughfares within Arlington.

Public transportation in Arlington is provided by Community Transit, a public transit authority that operates in most of Snohomish County. Community Transit runs all-day local bus service on one route from Downtown Arlington to Smokey Point, as well as four other routes to Marysville, Everett, Lake Stevens, Lynnwood, and Stanwood from a transit center in Smokey Point. During peak hours, Community Transit also provides local service from Darrington, and commuter service to the Boeing Everett Factory from a park and ride in downtown Arlington.

Arlington has one active railroad, a  spur line from Marysville to downtown Arlington operated by BNSF Railway (the successor to Burlington Northern). As part of the development of the Arlington Airport business park, BNSF Railway will build two rail spurs leading to the airport in the near future. Arlington does not have passenger rail service, but is near Amtrak stations in Everett and Stanwood.

Historically, Arlington developed along several railroads that have since been abandoned or re-purposed. The Seattle, Lake Shore and Eastern Railway, which spurred the establishment of Arlington in the 1880s, ran north–south through Arlington on its main line between Snohomish and the Canada–United States border. In 1892, it was acquired by the Northern Pacific Railway, which was acquired by Burlington Northern in 1970. Burlington Northern abandoned the railroad in 1972, favoring a parallel route to the west through Marysville, and it was converted into the Centennial Trail in the 1990s and 2000s. A Northern Pacific branch to Darrington, following the modern-day State Route 530, was built in 1901 and abandoned in 1990; the county government plans to use the right of way for the Whitehorse Trail, a multi-purpose trail.

The airport is primarily used for general aviation and light business, and is home to 475 aircraft, including 10 helicopters, 20 gliders, and 23 ultra-light aircraft. Approximately 130 businesses are located on airport property, of which one-quarter are involved in aviation-related uses directly impacting the airport. In the 1990s, the airport was explored as a candidate for expansion into a regional airport to relieve Seattle–Tacoma International Airport. The plan was ultimately abandoned by 1996, as the Puget Sound Regional Council instead chose to construct a third runway at Seattle–Tacoma International Airport.

Utilities

Electric power in Arlington is provided by the Snohomish County Public Utility District (PUD), a consumer-owned public utility that purchases most of its electricity from the federal Bonneville Power Administration (BPA). The BPA operates the region's system of electrical transmission lines, including Path 3, a major national transmission corridor running along the eastern side of Arlington towards British Columbia. Cascade Natural Gas and Puget Sound Energy provide natural gas to Arlington residents and businesses north and south of State Route 531, respectively; two major north–south gas pipelines run through Arlington and are maintained by the Olympic Pipeline Company, a subsidiary of BP, and the Northwest Pipeline Company, a subsidiary of Williams Companies. Arlington is served by three telephone companies and internet service providers: Comcast (Xfinity), Frontier Communications (including Verizon FiOS), and Wave Broadband.

The city of Arlington provides water and water treatment to approximately 5,548 customers within a  service area within the city limits and some surrounding areas. The city's water is sourced from groundwater deposits near Haller Park on the Stillaguamish River and near Arlington Municipal Airport, as well as water purchased from the Snohomish County PUD that is sourced from Spada Lake. The Smokey Point neighborhood is served by the City of Marysville's water system.

Wastewater and stormwater are collected and treated by the municipal government before being discharged into the Stillaguamish River basin. Arlington's municipal solid waste and single-stream recycling collection and disposal services are contracted by the municipal government to Waste Management; the Snohomish County government and Republic Services also operate a transfer station in Arlington.

Health care

Arlington is part of the Snohomish Public Hospital District No. 3, which operates the Cascade Valley Hospital, a 48-bed general hospital. The hospital was established in 1909 and was the last independent hospital in Snohomish County at the time of its acquisition in 2016. The city is also served by community clinics operated by Cascade Valley (and Skagit Regional Health) as well as The Everett Clinic and the Community Health Center of Snohomish County.

References

External links

 

 
Cities in Washington (state)
Cities in Snohomish County, Washington
Cities in the Seattle metropolitan area
Populated places established in 1890